AS Espoir Ambovombe is a Malagasy football club who currently plays in  the THB Champions League the top division of Malagasy football.
The team is based in the Ambovombe-Androy region in southern Madagascar.

References

External links
Soccerway

Espoir Ambovombe